Haliplus subguttatus is a species of crawling water beetle in the family Haliplidae.

References

Further reading

 
 
 
 
 
 
 
 
 

Haliplidae
Beetles described in 1913